Paracapillaria xenentodoni is a parasitic nematode present in the migratory fish Xenentodon cancila. It has been observed in India.

Description 
This species has a relatively large body size, with eggs reaching 0.040–0.049 × 0.021–0.026 mm. The structure of the male caudal extremity presents two wide, lobe-like, dorso-lateral caudal projections. 
It has a large spicule (0.236–0.374 mm) and a transversely wrinkled and non-spiny spicular sheath.
Its stichosome has 30–40 stichocytes and it has a slightly elevated anterior vulval lip.

References 

Enoplia
Parasitic nematodes of fish
Fauna of India
Nematodes described in 1994